Carpanthea pomeridiana, the afternoon carpanthea, is a species of flowering plant in the genus Carpanthea, native to the western Cape Provinces of South Africa, and introduced to New South Wales, Australia. It has gained the Royal Horticultural Society's Award of Garden Merit as an ornamental.

References

Aizoaceae
Endemic flora of South Africa
Plants described in 1926
Taxa named by N. E. Brown
Taxa named by Carl Linnaeus